This article presents the filmography of Hong Kong film and television actress, producer and recording artiste Jessica Hsuan.

Filmography

Television dramas

Film

Other

See also
List of awards and nominations received by Jessica Hsuan

References

External links 

Actress filmographies
Hong Kong filmographies